Woodlands is a suburb of Perth, Western Australia. Its local government area is the City of Stirling and it is in the federal Division of Curtin.

Many of the streets in Woodlands are named after trees, such as oak, elm, birch, sandalwood and willow.

History
Woodlands is part of the original Woodlands Estate owned by John Daniel Manning. Thomas William Mews was assigned a parcel of the land in 1831. Mews could not fulfil the required duties, and the grant passed to TRC Walters in 1840. It was later part of the land owned by Manning.

In 1842 the locality was named "Jackadup", the Aboriginal name for the area. This was later adapted to "Jackadder Lake", which is still the name of the lake in Woodlands.

Development in Woodlands started in the 1960s. The Floreat Lakes Estate to the south east was subdivided in 1991.

Woodlands is one of Perth's original northern suburbs.

In 1964 Lake View Rd (now Huntriss Rd), saw housing development commence in Woodlands. At this time there were no house between it and Jackadder Lake. Jim Graham was the builder who made many of the original 1960s homes in this street on approximately a fifth of an acre blocks. Many of the homes were purchased for amounts between £3000 to £4000.

The area was surrounded by many bush land areas. Pearson St housed stables, a battery and market gardens. Floreat was the nearest developed suburb and locals tended to shop at Floreat Forum which was then home to the department store Moores. Churchlands was largely undeveloped except for the high school and Herdsman Lake was house free at this time, and remained so until the 1980s.

Woodlands for many years was in the Floreat electorate (now Churchlands), and Andrew Mensaros was the member for many years.

Woodlands Village provided essentials and was home to Freecorns, a butcher, a school uniform shop, and for a time a Shell petrol station.

In the 1970s Woodlands Primary School had a student body of over 700 pupils.  There were approximately three classes in each year level from Grade 1 to 7; class sizes ranged generally from 30 to 36 students. Mr Larkin was principal for much of this period. Students walked to school and there was no traffic problems in the area at this time. The kindergarten was in Tamarisk Way with a walkway between houses from Castle Rd to Tamarisk Way. This was closed due to repeated noise complaints; the walkway land was offered for sale to the adjoining residents.

Liege St has seen many changes over the years, including the development of a putt putt course to a retirement village.

Around 1980 a man made island was formed in Jackadder Lake to provide a safe have for nesting wildlife. Many of the trees at the lake were planted by Woodlands Primary School students, who were made tree wardens.

Schools
Doubleview contains two primary schools:
 Woodlands Primary School, established in 1964 and located at 7 Bentwood Avenue
 Holy Rosary Catholic Primary School, established in 1959 and located at 35 Williamstown Road

Community Development
Woodlands is well serviced by parks and reserves. The most significant open space surrounds Jackadder Lake. Jackadder Lake was first recorded as "Mews Lake" in 1831 and provides a local recreation area.

There are several smaller parks in the locality, including Sweeting Reserve and Woodlands Reserve.

The neighbourhood retail area is called "Woodlands Village" and is located in the centre of the suburb. Ribbon development along Scarborough Beach Road in the north of Woodlands forms part of the Stirling Regional Centre and supplements local shopping.

The locality also contains a retirement village, while entertainment is provided by Event Cinemas on Liege Street.

References

Suburbs of Perth, Western Australia
Suburbs in the City of Stirling